

Children is the plural of child, a person who is not yet an adult. 

Children or The Children may also refer to:

Films
 Children, a 1976 short directed by Terence Davies
 The Children (1980 film), a low-budget horror film
 The Children (1984 film), a French film
 The Children (1990 film), a British-German drama film directed by Tony Palmer
 Children (2006 film), an Icelandic film
 The Children (2008 film), a British horror film
 Children (2011 film), a South Korean film
 The Children (2019 film), a 2019 American supernatural horror film

Literature
 "The Children" (1943), a Nelson Algren story in The Neon Wilderness
 Children (Gorky) (1910), a play by Maxim Gorky
 Children (play) (1974), by A. R. Gurney
 The Children (book) (1999), a book by David Halberstam
 The Children (play) (2016), a play by Lucy Kirkwood
 "Children" (short story), an 1886 short story by Anton Chekhov

Music
 Children (band), a Los Angeles–based psychedelic pop band
 Children (David Murray album) (1984)
 Children (The Mission album) (1988)
Children (EP), an EP by Seventh Avenue
 "Children" (Joe South song) (1970)
 "Children" (Robert Miles song) (1995)
 "Children" (V V Brown song) (2011)
 "Children", a song on EMF's album Schubert Dip
 "Children", a song on American's album America
 "Children", a song on Justin Bieber's album Purpose
 "Children", a song on Linda Perhacs' album The Soul of All Natural Things
 Children 18:3, a ska band

Television
 The Children (TV series), a three-part serial produced for ITV in the United Kingdom
 "The Children" (Game of Thrones), the season 4 finale of the television series Game of Thrones

People
 John George Children, chemist

See also
 Child (disambiguation)
 Mr. Children, a Japanese rock band